is the first single of the J-pop idol group Morning Musume subgroup Morning Musume Sakuragumi, released on September 18, 2003. In addition to the title song and its karaoke version, the single also contains Sakuragumi's version of "Dekkai Uchū ni Ai ga Aru", which was originally a B-side on Morning Musume single "The Peace!". Morning Musume Otomegumi also did a version of "Dekkai Uchū ni Ai ga Aru" at the same time as Morning Musume Sakuragumi on their first single, "Ai no Sono (Touch My Heart!)".
The A-side features fellow Hello! Project member Atsuko Inaba on chorus.

The single was very successful, selling roughly 81,866 copies (6,495 copies more than Otomegumi's 1st single "Ai no Sono (Touch My Heart!)") and reaching Number 2 on the Oricon charts, charting for eight weeks.

Track listings

CD

Single V DVD

Members at time of single
1st generation: Natsumi Abe
2nd generation: Mari Yaguchi
4th generation: Hitomi Yoshizawa, Ai Kago
5th generation: Ai Takahashi, Asami Konno, Risa Niigaki
6th generation: Eri Kamei

External links
Hare Ame Nochi Suki at Hello! Project's official site
Up-Front Works discography entry

References

Morning Musume songs
2003 debut singles
Song recordings produced by Tsunku
Songs written by Tsunku
Japanese-language songs
2003 songs
Zetima Records singles
Torch songs
Pop ballads
2000s ballads